Abul Momen (born December 18, 1948) is a Bangladeshi journalist. He had been a resident editor of Prothom Alo since 1998. He is currently the advisory editor of Dainik Suprabhat. He was awarded Ekushey Padak in 2017 by the Government of Bangladesh.

Background and career
Momen was born on December 18, 1948 in Chittagong district under Satkania Upazila at Keochia Union. He was the son of littérateur Abul Fazal. He completed his master's from the University of Dhaka. He worked in Chittagong Art College, The Daily Star and The Daily Bhorer Kagoj. He won Bangla Academy Literary Award in 2016 in the non-fiction category.

Personal life
Momen is married to Shila Momen. Together they have one daughter and one son.

References

Living people
1948 births
People from Satkania Upazila
Bangladeshi journalists
University of Dhaka alumni
Recipients of the Ekushey Padak
Recipients of Bangla Academy Award
Place of birth missing (living people)